German submarine U-2324 was a highly advanced submarine built for Nazi Germany's Kriegsmarine in World War II. U-2324 was one of the last commissioned boats to undertake an operational patrol, and one of just three of her class to undergo two. During these patrols, she succeeded in sinking a single small British coastal freighter, one of just five ships sunk by this submarine class.

U-2321 was built as a Type XXIII submarine at Hamburg during the spring of 1944. As an early production of a new class of boats which utilised new technologies, she required a lengthy period of sea trials and training to best develop the boat's offensive capabilities. It was thus not until January 1945 that her captain, Oberleutnant zur See Hans-Heinrich Haß, was permitted to take her on a patrol off the Eastern coast of Scotland.

Design
Like all Type XXIII U-boats, U-2324 had a displacement of  when at the surface and  while submerged. The submarine was powered by one MWM six-cylinder RS134S diesel engine providing , one AEG GU4463-8 double-acting electric motor electric motor providing , and one BBC silent running CCR188 electric motor providing .

U-2324 was fitted with two  torpedo tubes in the bow. She could carry two preloaded torpedoes. The complement was 14–18 men. This class of U-boat did not carry a deck gun.

Service history
The first patrol was unsuccessful, Allied precautions and counter-measures were effective enough to prevent her from successfully targeting even the small coastal vessels to be found in this area. She returned empty-handed, and Haß was replaced by Kapitänleutnant Konstantin von Rappard, who now commanded her for the remainder of her service career.

The second patrol was also unsuccessful. U-2324 returned to Stavanger in May 1945 the day before the surrender. When Germany surrendered, U-2324 was at Stavanger in Norway, from where it sailed to Loch Ryan in Scotland for disposal in Operation Deadlight. Towed out to sea on the 27 November, the boat was destroyed as a naval gunnery target.

References

Bibliography

External links
 

World War II submarines of Germany
Type XXIII submarines
Operation Deadlight
U-boats commissioned in 1944
1944 ships
Ships built in Hamburg
U-boats sunk in 1945
Ships sunk as targets
Maritime incidents in November 1945